Benoît Haaby (born 4 January 1982) is a French former professional footballer who played as a defender.

Haaby has played in Ligue 2 for Clermont Foot and Amiens SC.

References

External links
 
 

1982 births
Living people
Sportspeople from Haut-Rhin
French footballers
Footballers from Alsace
Association football defenders
Ligue 2 players
Championnat National players
Championnat National 2 players
Championnat National 3 players
FC Sochaux-Montbéliard players
Gazélec Ajaccio players
Clermont Foot players
Amiens SC players
SR Colmar players
FC Mulhouse players
ASC Biesheim players